Be bold may refer to:

 Boldness, the opposite of shyness
 "Be bold", the first part of a quote attributed to Basil King (1859–1928), a Canadian clergyman

See also
 Behold